Rakshita Suresh (born 1 June 1998) is one of the Indian playback singers  known for her work in Tamil, Hindi, Kannada and Telugu cinema. She was the Winner on Rhythm Tadheem aired on ETV Kannada and Title Winner of "Little Star Singer" 2009 aired on Asianet Suvarna (Kannada). She was first runner up in the reality show of Super Singer 6 aired on Star Vijay (Tamil) in 2018.

Early life
Rakshita was born on 1 June 1998, in Mysore Karnataka to Suresh and Anitha Suresh. She is a graduate in B.Sc. Rakshita started learning music at the age of 4 years. She is trained in  Carnatic Music, Hindustani Classical music and Light Music.

Career
She made her debut as a playback singer for Ilayaraja, she has sung many more singles in Tamil, Hindi, Kannada and Telugu. The first song that she recorded in Telugu was in 2015 for the film Yevade Subramanyam starring Telugu actor Nani. She delivered many solo concerts globally, both in India and abroad, like Mysuru "Yuva Dasara".

She started her career with music talent shows. Her first reality show in Kannada was "Yede Thumbi Haduvenu"  on ETV and  "Junior Super Stars" on Star Vijay (Tamil). Rakshita Suresh was the Winner on Rhythm Tadheem aired on ETV Kannada and Title Winner of "Little Star Singer" 2009 aired on Asianet Suvarna (Kannada). She was first runner up in the reality show of Super Singer 6 aired on Star Vijay (Tamil)  in 2018 through which she received lots of attention.

Rakshita made her Bollywood debut with the composition of A.R Rahman as She sang the song "Yaane Yaane" for the movie Mimi.

Discography

References

External links

Living people
Telugu playback singers
Indian women playback singers
21st-century Indian singers
1998 births
Singers from Mysore
21st-century Indian women singers
Women musicians from Karnataka
Indian women singers